Dárius Rusnák (born December 2, 1959) is a retired Slovak professional ice hockey forward who played in the Czechoslovak Extraliga for HC Slovan Bratislava. He was a member of the Czechoslovak 1981 Canada Cup team and was a silver medalist at the 1984 Winter Olympics. He won the gold medal at the 1985 world championship in Prague where he scored the game-winning goal against Canada.

Career statistics

Regular season and playoffs

International

External links

1959 births
Living people
Czechoslovak ice hockey centres
HC Dukla Jihlava players
HC Slovan Bratislava players
Ice hockey players at the 1984 Winter Olympics
KalPa players
Medalists at the 1984 Winter Olympics
Olympic ice hockey players of Czechoslovakia
Olympic silver medalists for Czechoslovakia
Sportspeople from Ružomberok
Philadelphia Flyers draft picks
Slovak ice hockey centres
Czechoslovak expatriate sportspeople in Finland
Czechoslovak expatriate ice hockey people
Slovak expatriate ice hockey players in Finland